Help in the Winter was a Slovene almanac published in 1944 by 110 anticommunist authors in protest against the Slovene Liberation Front's policy of cultural silence. Whereas the authors were gathered under the guise of charitable activity, later, their work was claimed to be a direct and effective opposition to the cultural silence. The authors who published the almanac did not join the Partisan movement.

References

Slovenia in World War II
20th-century Slovene literature
Political history of Slovenia
Almanacs